Pensacola State College (PSC), formerly Pensacola Junior College, is a public college in Pensacola, Florida. It is part of the Florida College System.

The main campus, located in Pensacola, was opened in 1948 and was the first institute of higher learning in Pensacola. Pensacola State quickly expanded to include a downtown campus in 1957, a Milton campus in 1971, and a Warrington campus in 1977, with centers on the Fairpoint Peninsula area of Santa Rosa County, as well as one in Century. A mini-campus opened on Naval Air Station Pensacola in 1981 but was destroyed during hurricane Ivan in 2004. In July 2010, the college changed its name to Pensacola State College in order to reflect its transition into offering four-year degrees. The current president is C. Edward Meadows. The college is accredited by the Commission on Colleges of the Southern Association of Colleges and Schools.

Academics

Courses
Pensacola State offers more than 120 majors and areas of concentration, especially focusing on career advancement and technical training. The school's collection of courses includes many that would also be found at other Florida colleges; however, PSC has increasingly been offering courses in cybersecurity, the culinary arts, pre-med, and other more technical and specific course paths.

The college offers associate and bachelor's degrees as well as vocational certifications and an adult high school. In the 2007–08 academic year over 34,000 students enrolled, of which about 11,000 sought associate degrees. As with all Florida state colleges, Pensacola State's associate in arts degree guarantees acceptance to a State University System of Florida institution.

Job placement is 100 percent in most technical areas for Pensacola State students earning certificates, A.S. and A.A.S. degrees.

Parterships and joint events
It works closely with University of West Florida and has a joint campus with the University of Florida in Milton.

Harvard professors held a three-day workshop at the Mary Ekdahl Smart Center for Patient Simulation Training & Research on the Warrington campus. This was the first time Harvard held such a seminar at a community college.

Non-student run media
Pensacola State operates WSRE, the main PBS station in Pensacola. It is complemented by the operation of WUWF, the main NPR station in the area, by the nearby University of West Florida.

Student publications

The Corsair 

The Corsair is the print and online student newspaper of Pensacola State College. The paper is circulated across campuses of Pensacola State College and is published monthly during the primary school year and once during the summer term. The paper is well awarded for a publication of its size and circulation. The paper primarily focuses on special events or occurrences involving its constituent college, in addition to student profiles, arts reports, editorials, and Pensacola State College sports reports.

Athletics 
The school's athletic teams compete in the Panhandle Conference of the Florida State College Activities Association, a body of the National Junior College Athletic Association Region 8.

Pensacola State College participates in many different collegiate sports, including basketball, softball, baseball, and cross country running.

Notable alumni

Joel Anthony, Former basketball player in the National Basketball Association
Joe Cannon, Former Major League Baseball outfielder
Greg Evers, Former member of the Florida Senate
Jerry L. Maygarden, Former member of the Florida House of Representatives
Dave Murzin, Former member of the Florida House of Representatives
Craig Waters, Communications counsel for the Florida Supreme Court
William H. Plackett, Former master chief petty officer of the Navy
Alan G. Poindexter, American naval officer and NASA astronaut
Billy Sadler, Former Major League Baseball relief pitcher
Victoria Nika Zdrok, Adult model, author and clinical psychologist

See also
Escambia Amateur Astronomers Association
Florida College System

References

External links

Pensacola State College Digital Archives

Educational institutions established in 1948
Florida College System
Universities and colleges accredited by the Southern Association of Colleges and Schools
Pensacola, Florida
Pensacola metropolitan area
Education in Escambia County, Florida
Buildings and structures in Escambia County, Florida
Tourist attractions in Pensacola, Florida
1948 establishments in Florida
NJCAA athletics
Pensacola State College